Dianne H. Woody (died July 9, 2016) was an American politician who served as a member of the Washington State Senate from 1977 to 1985.  She represented Washington's 39th legislative district as a Democrat.  Her husband, Frank, held the seat before her from 1973 until his death in 1977, about half a year into his second term.  Upon Frank's death, Diane was appointed to fill the vacancy and went on to win a special election to serve out the remainder of Frank's unexpired term.  She then won reelection in the regular election of 1981 and served out the term, ending in 1985.

References

2016 deaths
Democratic Party Washington (state) state senators
Women state legislators in Washington (state)